Nayakuralu Nagamma was a 12th-century renowned statesperson and minister to King Nalagama, the ruler of Palanadu in Guntur District. She is one of the key characters, along with Bramha Naidu, in the epic war - Palnati Yudham (War of Palnad) set in the medieval Andhra Pradesh, a southern state of India.

References 

 B S L Hanumantha Rao, Social Mobility in Medieval Andhra, Telugu Academy Press
 Palanati Vira charitra, Oral Epic
 http://www.andhrabulletin.in/AB_Maguva/maguva_veeravanitha_nagamma.php

History of Andhra Pradesh
14th-century Indian women
14th-century Indian people
Date of birth unknown
Date of death missing